Ying Ye 3 Jia 1 (樱野3加1), also known as Sakurano in the Philippines, is a Taiwanese drama that airs Sunday on TTV/SETTV. This drama brings back Ming Dao, Joe Chen and Qiao En. Released in 2007, Ying Ye 3 jia 1 story is about rebellious high school boys and girl but very cute and pure. The story is set in Ying Ye high school, where the amateur detective group with Ah Jiang, Xia Tian, Fang Wei and Bulu doing their own personal case and also help their classmate if they got trouble. After passed a lot of trouble of their age, they had their own experienced and also knew the value of friendships.

Synopsis
Xia Tian, Jia Jiang, Fang Wei, and Bulu all grew up on Westside Street together and currently study in Ying Ye School, one month away from graduation.

Xia Tian's dad is a police officer in Westside Street and is retiring tomorrow. But just on that day, they all had a fight at school with the Dinosaur gang, and were almost expelled by the principal. Officer Xia went to settle the conflict and not only did it not get settled, his gun got misplaced by the principal too. Everyone thus discussed things, and decided that they all will remain in the school, including Ah Jiang, and they must find the gun within one month of graduation to let Officer Xia retire peacefully and happily. Jia Jiang, Fang Wei and Bulu can then successfully graduate.

While finding the missing gun, they discovered that Grey Wolf, an ex-convict who escaped from prison, is possibly connected with the missing gun and even more surprisingly, Grey Wolf is actually having close communication and contact with students in Ying Ye.

Among the teenagers, they had to cooperate to find Officer Xia's missing gun, and this let Ah Jiang and Xia Tian, who have been at loggerheads since they were young, to develop feelings for each other. Fang Wei, who has always liked Xia Tian, now becomes the love rival of Ah Jiang. This love triangle will have what impact on Ah Jiang and Fang Wei's friendship? Ah Jiang and Xia Tian used to be as close as siblings; will their relationship change? Who stole Officer Xia's gun? And how are they going to find it? What will be discovered in their process? Let the four people use their own ways to bring you this story in the summer of 2007. During a gun conflict with Grey Wolf and Officer Xia, Ah Jiang jumped in to save Xia Tian who was held hostage by Grey Wolf and was shot in the crossfire. During Jiang's coma, Xia Tian went to retrieve some fireflies, and a strange man who starts to take an interest in Xia Tian himself.

Characters
 Yang Jia Jiang/Ah Jiang
Ah Jiang, Xia Tian, Fang Wei and Bulu grew up together and became great friends. Ah Jiang and Xia Tian have always argued, fought, and teased each other since they were young, but they don't realise that they love each other. He doesn't have a father but he promised his father that he would protect their family including Xia Tian. He is brave, very handsome, proud and a bully to Kong Long because Kong Long bullied his friends. He considers Officer Xia his own father. His mother opens a food stall. He is jealous of Fang Wei because Fang Wei wants to woo Xia Tian to be his girlfriend.

 Xia Tian
She is Police Officer Xia's daughter. Xia Tian didn't realise that she has feelings towards Ah Jiang. Her mom left her and her dad a long time ago but her relationship with her father is strong. She is brave, doesn't show her weakness easily and always protects her friend, Xiao Hui, from Kong Long. Her special technique is using her shoe as her weapon. Many people fall victim to this, such as her three childhood friends and even her father.

 Fang Wei
Fang Wei comes from a rich family but his father is always busy with his work. He is a spoilt brat, proud and rich, but he is also a generous person. For example, he stole his father's money and gave it to his mother and daughter, selling handmade dolls by the roadside. He likes Xia Tian too and wants to woo Xia Tian to be his girlfriend, but he realised that Ah Jiang also likes Xia Tian, and he accepted Ah Jiang as his opponent although Ah Jiang is his friend.

 Bulu
Bulu likes cooking but his father wants him to run his martial arts class. He likes cleaning his room, doing housework and when he is in a bad mood, he likes to sew. If Ah Jiang and Fang Wei argue, he will try to stop them from fighting. He secretly dates Xiao Hui.

Cast
 Ming Dao as Yang Jia Jiang/Ah Jiang 楊家將
 Chen Qiao En as Xia Tian 夏天
 Jason Hsu as Wang Dao Ren/Bulu
 Jerry Huang Zhi Wei as Fang Wei 方威
 Zhang Xin Yu as Zhen Wen Hui 曾雯茴
 Liu Zhe Ying as Su Xiao Han 舒曉寒
 Hang Li Ren (張力仁) as Kong Long 孔龍
 Ye Min Zhi (葉民志) as Wu Lu 武律
 Lee Tien-chu as Detective Xia 夏警官
 Viter Fan Zhi Wei as Hsu Ding Kai/Captain D.K. Hsu/Brother Frog

Episode summary
Episode 1

It is a lively day at Westside Street square, where all the young people are gathered together to enjoy this energetic summer day. Xiao Hui and Xia Tian have agreed to meet here so that Xia Tian can accompany Xiao Hui to sell something. Unexpectedly this transaction is with none other than the student bully – the Ying Ye Three Little Dragons’ leader, Kong Long! Xia Tian, Ah Jiang, Fang Wei, Bulu, these 4 childhood classmates and good friends who grew up together on Old Westside Street, when they see that Xiao Hui is in trouble, how can they just stand aside and not help her? As a result, they got into a fight with Kong Long. Ying Ye Three Little Dragons’ Xiao Wei sees how Kong Long is no match for Ah Jiang and his friends and so he comes up with the idea to seek Councilor Kong's help. As a result, Councilor Kong uses his own private powers to make this small matter bigger than it really is. Ah Jiang and Kong Long's dispute becomes the headline news for the next day: "Westside Street Bully Threatens with a Gun."

This incident creates a big stir throughout the campus of Ying Ye School. With Officer Xia's help, the principal requests Kong Long to reconcile with Ah Jiang. However, a phone call from Councilor Kong at this time, requests that the principal expel Ah Jiang, Fang Wei and Bulu from school. This makes the whole matter even more difficult to resolve! Councilor Kong's call becomes pressure on the principal, who has no choice but to expel Ah Jiang and his friends from school. Officer Xia, who is on the eve of retiring tomorrow, due to his assistance in helping to resolve this dispute, accidentally lost his gun within the Ying Ye School campus. The principal proposes the condition that as long as Ah Jiang and his friends are able to help Officer Xia find his gun, then he will not expel them from school. Would Ah Jiang accept this condition? And where has Officer Xia lost his gun? A lost gun, a few students who could possibly be sentenced to be expelled from school, will start an incredible story within Ying Ye School!

Episode 2

On the verge of retirement, Officer Xia accidentally lost his gun within the Ying Ye School campus while he is helping to resolve the dispute between Ah Jiang's gang and Kong Long. On her way home to prepare to go to Officer Xia's honorary retirement celebration party, Xia Tian finds out from Ah Jiang, Fang Wei and Bulu that her father lost his gun. Seeing the forced smile on Officer Xia's face at the retirement party, Xia Tian silently tells herself that she must help her father find his gun back. Ah Jiang, Fang Wei and Bulu are discussing how to help Officer Xia find his gun when Xia Tian shows up. She asks Ah Jiang to consider the principal's exchange conditions – do not be expelled and stay in school to help Officer Xia to find his gun. Ah Jiang has already decided to help Officer Xia find his gun, but he deliberately teases Xia Tian saying that she is only asking for his help because she does not want to be "Ah Lu Ka" by Kong Long. Xia Tian's worries are mocked by Ah Jiang which makes her upset, and she runs out into the rainy night in tears. Ah Jiang is startled to realize that he has hurt Xia Tian and in the quiet night, he sends a text message to Xia Tian telling her that he will definitely go to school tomorrow.

Early the next morning, Ah Jiang, Fang Wei, and Bulu got into a car accident and had a conflict with a mysterious biker en route to school and almost did not make it in time. Luckily, the three guys made it through the school entrance at the last second and help to save Xia Tian from her crisis. Seeing how he is about to be made into a fool, Kong Long secretly makes a deal with Xia Tian. As long as Xia Tian does not "Ah Lu Ka" him, then he will ask his Councilor father to not give Ah Jiang any more trouble. In order to protect Ah Jiang, Xia Tian defends Kong Long by biting Ah Jiang and wounding him. In his anger, Ah Jiang says that he will not care about Xia Tian's business anymore and turns around to leave. Fang Wei rushes after Ah Jiang to persuade him. He tells Ah Jiang that if Ah Jiang does not want to protect Xia Tian anymore, then he is going to take action and begin his pursuit of Xia Tian...

Episode 3

Because Xia Tian suddenly forgave Kong Long and prevented Ah Jiang from "Ah Lu Ka-ing" Kong Long, Ah Jiang, who does not know the whole truth behind Xia Tian's actions, almost had a big falling out with Xia Tian. Ah Jiang even tells Fang Wei, who wants to pursue Xia Tian, that "If you want to pursue her, then go ahead. No one is going to stop you." On the other hand, the sulking Xia Tian hears Xiao Han saying that she has decided to confess her feelings to Ah Jiang and also asks Xia Tian for her help. Xia Tian has mixed feelings in her heart and does not know how she is supposed to respond. In order to investigate Officer Xia's missing gun, everyone arrives at the Sunny Haunted House for the first time, but they did not find any clues. Because Xia Tian is still mad at Ah Jiang, she decides to stay at the Sunny Haunted House by herself to look for clues. Unexpectedly, the sound of a gunshot suddenly rings out through the Sunny Haunted House. Aside from Xia Tian's astonishment, everyone finds a suspicious clue within the Sunny Haunted House – a muddy footprint on the floor and within the thick patch of grass lies an empty bullet shell. But does the footprint really belong to the person who opened fire? And is there any relation between the empty bullet shell at the scene and Officer Xia's missing gun? These clues are testing these four youngsters who have made a deal with the principal to stay in school and search for Officer Xia's missing gun.

Fang Wei suggests using Xia Tian's birthday as an excuse to give shoes to the entire student body at school. This way, they can use the information from the shoe sizes of everyone to find the owner of the muddy footprint left at the scene. Naturally, Fang Wei takes this opportunity to confess his feelings to Xia Tian and expresses his intention to pursue her. Early the next day, all the teachers and students gather in the auditorium. Fang Wei goes on stage and announces the matter of giving of the shoes and Xia Tian's birthday. He continues to confess his feelings to Xia Tian in front of everyone when the lights suddenly turn off in the auditorium... Did Fang Wei's confession fail? Following this how will Xia Tian's birthday be celebrated? Ah Jiang told Fang Wei to go ahead and pursue Xia Tian; is this for real? What is the result of the comparison of the footprints? All the answers are waiting for them to be revealed one by one...

Episode 4

Fang Wei carefully plans Xia Tian's birthday party. Just when everyone is happily celebrating Xia Tian's birthday, Xiao Hui rushes to leave first because she needs to get to work. Kong Long follows Xiao Hui after she leaves. Bulu discovers that Kong Long must be up to no good and drags Ah Jiang along to help out so as to prevent Xiao Hui from being bullied by Kong Long again. Just when Ah Jiang and Bulu are about to leave, they bump into Fang Wei who is trying to confess his feelings to Xia Tian again. Ah Jiang hurriedly stuffs a small gift at Xia Tian and says "Happy Birthday" to her before he leaves. In a dark alley, Kong Long stops Xiao Hui and requests the return of the money for the treasure that he bought. Xiao Hui refuses to give him the money and cries for Xia Tian's help. When everyone arrives at the place where Xiao Hui says she's at, they see Ah Jiang and Bulu holding up a badly beaten Kong Long. Dai Wei and Xiao Wei insist that Ah Jiang and Bulu beat Kong Long up in order to help Xiao Hui. Ah Jiang did not pay them any mind and decided to take Kong Long to the hospital to be treated first.

At the hospital, Councilor Kong arrives with a whole entourage of people. He refuses to listen to reason and insists that Ah Jiang and Bulu are the ones who have injured Kong Long. He demands to take the two of them to the police station to be dealt with. Xia Tian tries to defend them and gets slapped on the face by Councilor Kong. Fang Wei is startled to discover that the person who turned the lights off in the auditorium is Ah Jiang. Their friendship is on the verge of a big crisis. The result of the comparison of the footprints is finally out. This astonishing result causes Bulu to fall into a contradiction. Because of his clash at the hospital with Xia Tian, Ah Jiang and the others, Councilor Kong immediately arrives at the school the next day to bring trouble. Ying Ye 3+1 falls into a crisis; how will they face it? How will they solve these difficult problems?

Episode 5

Fang Wei's confession at the auditorium which is ruined by Ah Jiang shutting off the lights has put a major strain on their friendship. On the other hand, Kong Long's attack by a mysterious person leads to Councilor Kong's insistence in suing Ah Jiang and Bulu for injuring Kong Long. Despite the wedge driven in their friendship, Fang Wei finds a group of international lawyers from his father's company to help Ah Jiang and Bulu from being thrown into jail. Ah Jiang's heart is filled with appreciation and Fang Wei understands but both are still on non-speaking terms with each other...
The result of the comparison of the footprints is finally out. This astonishing result causes Bulu to fall into a contradiction. While taking Xiao Hui home, Bulu frankly questions her. Xiao Hui is stunned and solemnly asks Bulu to keep it a secret. The next day, Xiao Hui secretly goes to the Sunny Haunted House and gives a sum of money to Grey Wolf. She even asks the mysterious Grey Wolf to help stop Councilor Kong's evil ways. As expected, Councilor Kong gets threatened with BB pellets and a warning note and he immediately drops the charges on Ah Jiang and Bulu. However, this threatening move brings about more of Councilor Kong's resentment and trouble... Officer Xia's gun is still not found yet and there is already more trouble coming. For his mom, Xia Tian and his good friends, how will Ah Jiang deal with Councilor Kong? How much longer will Xiao Hui and Bulu's secret be kept? Because of her weak principal father, Xiao Han is always being scorned and ridiculed by Fang Wei. How will their relationship change? All these answers will be brought about to us by Ying Ye 3+1...

Episode 6

Because of his conflict with Councilor Kong, Ah Jiang's family's shop in Guan Dong gets destroyed. Ah Jiang shoulders the responsibility of taking care of his mother. For his mother and his aunt's safety, for Xia Tian and his friends, Ah Jiang surrenders to Councilor Kong. He agrees to publicly reconcile with the Kong father and son at the tea party that Councilor Kong is holding. Seeing how Ah Jiang is shouldering all the humiliation, Xia Tian decides to go look for the surveillance videotape from Li Chang's office, of the day when Kong Long was beaten. Fang Wei follows her and they both look for evidence to clear Ah Jiang's name. Yet they both accidentally get locked inside the basement where all the information is. They could not send a message from their cell phone, and they both searched diligently for Ah Jiang all night long. Xia Tian and Fang Wei spent the whole night together and the next morning, they bump into Xiao Wei, who has arrived to organize the warehouse. Xiao Wei takes a photo of Xiao Tian together with Fang Wei which triggers Ah Jiang's inexplicable jealousy.

Just when Ah Jiang is being spiteful to Xia Tian, without a care to everyone's objection and hindrance, Ah Jiang goes alone to the tea party that Councilor Kong is holding at Westside Street. Worried about his family and his friends’ safety, Ah Jiang is forced to go on stage to make a public apology and to also reinforce Councilor Kong's contribution to the local area. The neighborhood is buzzing with discussion on Ah Jiang's behavior. Would Xia Tian and Fang Wei be able to find useful evidence to help Ah Jiang to get the justice he deserves? And also to help everyone see what Councilor Kong's true colors are? Ah Jiang and Xia Tian are back on good terms with each other following the settlement of Councilor Kong's matter. Everyone urges Ah Jiang to repay Xia Tian for all the hard work she has done to help him with a kiss. At first, Ah Jiang was not willing but after a verbal argument with Xia Tian, they both finally stand face to face and prepare to kiss. This kiss, will it really happen in the end? After this romantic night, what sort of change will come about for Ah Jiang, Xia Tian and Fang Wei's relationship?

Episode 7

After settling the dispute with Councilor Kong, Ah Jiang, Xia Tian and the others are happily celebrating. Fang Wei and Xiao Han left the celebration early, because his father is rarely home and so Fang Wei pulls Xiao Han along to attend the banquet that his father is holding. Xiao Hui uses the excuse that her grandmother wants her to go home early and leaves with Bulu. A half drunk Xia Tian and Ah Jiang are left alone by themselves. Coincidentally, Officer Xia must coordinate his duty to arrest Grey Wolf and asks Ah Jiang to take Xia Tian back to his place to spend the night. Xiao Han accompanies Fang Wei to the elegant banquet that his father is holding. Due to some words from Father Fang's secretary, this elegant banquet momentary turns into a heated argument. Fang Wei reveals the hopes that he has in his heart for his family and for his father. When he did not get the response that he wanted, he angrily leaves. On this night, Xiao Han's bad impression of Fang Wei changes from the rich playboy image that she once had. She comforts him and even supports his pursuit of Xia Tian. This helps to resolve their previous opposition to each other and brings their relationship closer.

On the way home, the drunk Xia Tian uses her drunken state to confess her feelings to Ah Jiang. This causes Ah Jiang to struggle with his feelings internally. He does not know if he does not dare to or if he is not willing to acknowledge that he likes Xia Tian, this longtime childhood friend of his whom he has always had a brother-like relationship with. Xia Tian's continuous grumbling and nagging forces Ah Jiang to unexpectedly kiss her in order to shut her up. This scene is witnessed by Fang Wei, who has finally gathered up his courage to pursue Xia Tian. These two good friends, Fang Wei and Ah Jiang, soon have their relationship once again put to a test. Early in the morning, everyone gathers at Sunny Haunted House to watch over Kong Long while he cleans the place up. Kong Long is scared out of his wits and runs away. Everyone goes separate ways and swears to catch Kong Long. Xia Tian notices that something is stirring in the bush behind the haunted house. She leaps over and unexpectedly catches Grey Wolf instead. A gun falls out of Grey Wolf's pocket. Is this the same gun as the one Officer Xia is missing? Xia Tian is quick but she is not strong enough, so would she be able to capture Grey Wolf? Or would Ah Jiang and Fang Wei show up just in time to help?

Episode 8

Officer Xia used Xian Tian as Grey Wolf's daughter as a bet in hopes that Grey Wolf would soften his heart in the face of valuing kinship and let go of Xian Tian, who is being held at gunpoint. Ah Jiang, Fang Wei and Bulu, who have been childhood companions with Xia Tian and grew up together with her, are all staring at the scene in front of them speechless. Without a care for his own safety, Ah Jiang charges toward Grey Wolf to protect Xia Tian. Grey Wolf is startled by the sudden movement and the bullet shoots right at Ah Jiang. During the surgery in the operation room, one of Ah Jiang's arteries bursts and his heart stops beating. With the collaboration of all the doctors and Ah Jiang's own persisting determination, Ah Jiang is admitted into the intensive care unit and placed under a 24-hour observation period. However, in a flash, Ah Jiang is able to get up from bed and when he returns home, he actually sees his grandmother, who has died many years ago. What is this trying to foretell? When he returns to the hallway at the hospital, he sees a grieving Xia Tian. Ah Jiang shouts loudly and emotionally runs over to hug her but he could not touch her and gets no response back in return.

Xia Tian's strong appearance could no longer hide her distraught emotions. When she looks at the first birthday present that Ah Jiang gave her, she reminisces about each and every detailed memory that she has growing up with Ah Jiang. In the last photo, she unexpectedly discovers the firefly that Ah Jiang drew along with the words "Giving you two autumn fireflies, wish you a happy birthday! May everything go as you wish! May all your wishes come true!" This actually stirs up Xia Tian's secret promise with Ah Jiang. Xia Tian decides to go and look for autumn fireflies and hopes that her blessings for Ah Jiang would be able to come true. However, the farm that is in her memories unexpectedly turns out to be a barren land. Not willing to give up so easily, Xia Tian goes poking around. Out of nowhere, a dog suddenly barks and chases her. Xia Tian panics and climbs over the wall of someone's house. A handsome young guy holds up a gun to stop her.

Episode 9

It's a miracle! It is Ah Jiang and also Xia Tian's wish not to give up on life. Ah Jiang and Xia Tian passed by the gates of death which caused their relationship to deepen even more. Fang Wei gives them his sincere blessings and withdraws from the fight over Xia Tian. His conflict with Ah Jiang comes to an end and their brotherly friendship is once again on steady grounds. Ah Jiang will be released from the hospital soon. Xia Tian, Fang Wei, Bulu and Xiao Han all come. Xiao Hui is scared and does not dare to face everyone. Under Xiao Han's continuous inquiry, Xiao Hui tells everyone about her, her grandma and Grey Wolf's relationship. Everyone forgives Xiao Hui and Grey Wolf. On the side, Councilor Kong is surprised to realize that the gun that Kong Long picked up is actually Officer Xia's gun. This is a really serious matter. Let's see how Councilor Kong will use this information against everyone!

Xia Tian takes Ah Jiang to "Mob Boss" D.K. Xu's house to return his coat and also to express her gratitude. However, "Mob Boss" D.K. Xu is not home. At the moment, he is actually at a baseball field meeting with a few Thai people over a drug deal. After Officer Xia and Xiao Gu find out the news, they surrounded the baseball field. Yet at the most crucial moment, the criminals were able to escape. The Police Bureau Investigation Unit immediately asked Officer Xia and Xiao Gu to report back to the bureau. Will Officer Xia's missing gun incident be exposed at this time? Is "Mob Boss" D.K. Xu really a mob boss or does he have another identity? Will Ah Jiang and Xia Tian immediately get into the romantic and sweet life of a prince and princess after their life and death experience?

Episode 10

Officer Xia and Xiao Gu failed in their duty to capture the drug dealers and have been ordered to report back to the Police Bureau Investigation Unit. Councilor Kong was trying to be smart but he actually helped Officer Xia to regain the gun that he has lost instead. As for D.K., he turns out to be the orphan of an innocent bystander who was injured by a stray bullet 10 years ago when Officer Xia was on duty trying to capture criminals. At that time, Officer Xia temporarily gave shelter to D.K., and then D.K. was adopted by his relatives in the U.S. Now, D.K. is actually an outstanding police officer and in order to arrest international drug lord Du Xiao, D.K. becomes an undercover cop. D.K. and Officer Xia's reunion causes Xia Tian to remember her childhood memories. In addition to Ah Jiang's miraculous recovery, Xia Tian and Tian Ji Ge aka D.K. talk enthusiastically about the past. This puts pressure on Ah Jiang's newly growing love for Xia Tian. Fortunately, he still has his two good buddies, Fang Wei and Bulu, to help plan a perfect and romantic date. Fang Wei even provides one of his family's vacation villas on a private island for Ah Jiang to use as a battlefield against Tian Ji Ge.

Unexpected visitors appear on the romantic private island beach. At the vacation villa, Xia Tian is filled with joy and anticipates the very first date that Ah Jiang has planned so carefully. When they were both enjoying this romantic time together, Fang Wei, Bulu, Du Xiao, D.K. and the special crimes unit unexpectedly show up... Is this the surprise that Fang Wei and Bulu are giving to Ah Jiang? Or is this something that Tian Ji Ge planned for intentionally? A romantic battlefield or a beautiful risk?

Episode 11

Originally it was supposed to be a perfect, romantic and luxurious date, but because of the unexpectedly appearance of Du Xiao, it caused Xia Tian much embarrassment. The plan that D.K. spent three years planning also failed. Ah Jiang admits that his childish manner towards love is what causes Xia Tian to get hurt. Even though Xia Tian is angry and hurt, but she has already forgiven Ah Jiang in her heart. However, Ah Jiang does not know that and he is still trying to think of ways to make it up to Xia Tian.

In order to save them, D.K. injured himself with his own gun. Xia Tian feels extremely bad over this, and she carefully picks up the pieces of the wind chime that Tian Ji Ge stepped on. She puts it inside a small bag and returns it to D.K. In order to resolve D.K. and Ah Jiang's misunderstanding, Xia Tian spends the whole night making a new wind chime. The next morning, she wakes up D.K. and goes with him to hang the wind chime up at the street corner where he and his girlfriend broke up. D.K. is greatly touched and he kisses and hugs Xia Tian. Xia Tian is extremely surprised and Ah Jiang, who sees all of this from across the street, is stunned.

There are only 3 days left before the graduation dance. Within the Ying Ye campus, everyone is bustling around with excitement and happily discussing who they will be going to the dance with. In everyone's eyes, it is perfectly natural that Xia Tian and Ah Jiang will be going as a couple. Unexpectedly the scene of the early morning hug between D.K. and Xia Tian causes Ah Jiang to treat Xia Tian very coldly and without much emotion on his face. Xia Tian and everyone have no idea what is going on. Because of the gun incident on Westside Street, Ying Ye School specially arranges a self-defense class for everyone. The guest teacher of this self-defense class turns out to be Mr. D.K. Xu. Ah Jiang is called up to the stage for a demonstration. Will the impulsive Ah Jiang use this demonstration as training or as retaliation? Does D.K. regard Xia Tian as a younger sister or another lover? The waves of love are slowly surging; Ying Ye 3+1 invites you to fan the wind and light the fire.

Episode 12

Fang Wei and Bulu are going all around searching for evidence to help Ah Jiang prove to Xia Tian that D.K. has other motives. In order to give Xia Tian an unforgettable prom night, Ah Jiang accepted a temporary stunt drive job under Bulu's father's introduction. The simple trail test was no problem for Ah Jiang at all. He had so much confidence that he asked for half of the pay in advance from the director and takes Xia Tian to go shopping for tomorrow's prom. He wants Xia Tian to be the girl that everyone in the entire school will be envious of.

In the career line of the school's employment counseling form, Xia Tian fills in "Guan Dong Shop’s boss." When Officer Xia receives the form from D.K., many feelings well up inside his heart. What is the correct way to plan Xia Tian's future? D.K. immediately suggests to Officer Xia that with Xia Tian's skills, the U.S.’s Federal Law Enforcement training organization specializes in recruiting and training various countries’ special talents for the police force.

Xia Tian and Ah Jiang should fall into the group of people that they are looking for. Officer Xia immediately hopes that Xia Tian will go to the U.S. to advance her studies as per D.K.’s suggestion. However, Xia Tian doesn’t want to spend all of her father’s retirement money. She also doesn’t want to leave Westside Street, where she has spent her whole life, her friends and Ah Jiang. Ah Jiang’s temporary job is actually an advertisement MV shoot for the famous celebrity, Joyce. Aside from the driving stunt, he will also have to film an intimate scene with her. Ah Jiang will be playing right into the hands of the celebrity. Coincidentally, D.K. arrives to assist and patrol the area around the filming scene. Xia Tian also comes to join in the fun.

Episode 13

Bulu still hasn’t finished his graduation paper yet. Fang Wei, Xiao Han, and Xiao Hui all kept him company at the library overnight while Bulu worked on his paper. Xiao Hui helps Bulu to gather much information. In an English periodical about the wisdom of criminal psychology, they discover a published article called "Psychology of an Avenger, by D.K. Hsu." The case in the article causes one to be frightened and alarmed. When the murderer was a child, he once witnessed his mother's death from a police officer's stray bullet. In one night, he becomes an orphan. He swears to become a police officer and carefully plans his revenge. The target of his revenge will be the daughter of the police officer who killed his mother! The content of the article seems vaguely similar to Officer Xia, Xia Tian and D.K.’s situation. Suddenly the atmosphere becomes very tense and everyone stares at each other and trembles with fear.

Early in the morning, Ah Jiang has to head over to the place where he will be filming the advertisement MV with Joyce. In order to come up with the money to return to D.K., Xia Tian finds herself a job. Officer Xia hands over the newspaper for Xia Tian to see. A huge picture of Joyce kissing Ah Jiang is published as headline news in the Entertainment section. Since Xia Tian was also at the scene of the filming yesterday, she helps Ah Jiang to explain things with her father. She says that the media is doing this just to create news about Joyce. Ah Jiang and Xia Tian meet on the road. Ah Jiang persuades Xia Tian to obey Officer Xia's arrangements and go with D.K. to the U.S. to study criminology. Xia Tian insists that she will only have happiness wherever Ah Jiang is.

After seeing a job posting, Xia Tian arrives at a certain office to apply for a job. Her job is to dress up in a cute nurse outfit with lots of makeup and stand out on the streets to recruit customers for an X-rated motel. Xia Tian awkwardly starts to call out to people passing by. Suddenly she gets arrested by a police officer and is taken to the police station on the charge of indecent behavior in public. The speechless Xia Tian could only wait for the furious Officer Xia and D.K. to come and bail her out. Ah Jiang works furiously to perform well. He still loses control while performing the driving stunt and the flying dust injures his eye. However, he still manages to finish this filming shoot. After his work ended, Ah Jiang gets the remainder of the money of $20,000NT. He is just about to rush off to the school to attend the graduation dance, when Joyce asks him why waste so much effort on love? D.K. takes the photo of Xia Tian dressed up in a nurse outfit with heavy makeup to question Ah Jiang if this is how Xia Tian will be dressed up in the future. Are the contents written in D.K.’s paper real? Or is he just practicing his writing skills? Xia Tian's job lands her in the police station. How will Officer Xia face the looks from his colleagues? What will become of Ah Jiang and Xia Tian's future? What is the legend of Ying Ye School's graduation dance?

Episode 14

The graduation dance party has already ended. Xia Tian is still anticipating the appearance of Ah Jiang. Under everyone's consolation, Xia Tian still insists on waiting at Westside Street for Ah Jiang's arrival in the downpour. D.K. receives a call from Ah Jiang who asks D.K. to go and pick up Xia Tian. After spending a whole night out in the rain and being emotionally hurt, Xia Tian falls sick. Ah Jiang watches from the side helplessly as D.K. takes the sick Xia Tian away. The tears in Ah Jiang's heart are even bigger than the rain that is falling down from the sky.

Early the next morning, D.K. confesses his feelings to Xia Tian. Xia Tian could not accept him and seizes the chance to leave and go to Ah Jiang's house to ask him what is going on. Joyce also coincidentally arrives at Ah Jiang's house to ask him if he is willing to be her bodyguard. In order to get Xia Tian to give up on him, Ah Jiang asks Joyce to help him out by putting on an act. He wants to deliberately make Xia Tian mad so that she can let go of her feelings for him and pursue a better future. Fang Wei and Bulu cannot stand the attitude that Ah Jiang is showing towards Xia Tian. They angrily throw down the diploma and leave with Xia Tian. Joyce can actually see through Ah Jiang's heart and knows that he still loves Xia Tian very deeply. She also seems to realize that there seems to be some problems with Ah Jiang's eyes and she requests Ah Jiang to go see a doctor immediately.

A few days ago, D.K.’s attempt to catch Solomen has still not succeeded yet. In order to avoid becoming Solomen's prey, D.K. hides out for a few days at Officer Xia's house. The landlord calls him and tells him that there are strange sounds coming from his house and that the police dog that he raises has not been seen for a couple of days. A coldness spreads over D.K.’s heart. He immediately gathers the special police force to discuss their next plan of action. The 100th episode of a popular variety show is being filmed at the amusement park. Xia Tian puts all her pride and feelings aside to participate in the show in hopes of getting Ah Jiang's eyes back on her again. A building eight stories high, mixed emotions, what sort of feelings will fly out of control? Or will the scene be out of control? Or perhaps the plan will get out of control?

Episode 15

Putting all her pride and feelings on the line, Xia Tian jumps down from a high building. In the end, Ah Jiang manages to catch her. Everyone on the scene was praising and applauding while calling out in alarm. The director of the program was also deeply moved by this touching scene and believes that when this 100th episode is broadcast, the ratings will fly off the charts. Unexpectedly, Ah Jiang turns Xia Tian over to D.K. and tells her that her future is in the hands of D.K. and not himself. He coldly leaves and Xia Tian's heart is torn to pieces. Even Joyce cannot stand Ah Jiang's actions and after giving him a scolding, she fires him.

Xia Tian decides to go with D.K. to the U.S. to advance her studies. Fang Wei and Bulu still have their doubts about D.K. With regards to Xia Tian's decision and Ah Jiang's behavior, Fang Wei and Bulu rack their brains out hoping that those two will be able to get back together. They invited Xiao Han and Xiao Hui to plan a 3+1 farewell camping party. They also hope to expose D.K.’s conspiracy as soon as possible. Ah Jiang's vision is getting worse and worse. The answer that the doctor gives to Ah Jiang causes him to lose all his will and he becomes absent minded when he does things. As a result, under Fang Wei's deliberate arrangement, Ah Jiang reluctantly accepts the 3+1 farewell camping party. On the eve before Xia Tian's departure, they will revisit their memories one last time.

Officer Xia has to attend his last mission with D.K. before his retirement. He tells Xia Tian to leave a happy memory with her childhood friends. After coming home from the camping trip, she should gather up her feelings, pack her bags and go along with D.K. to the U.S. to study. It turns out that this mission is to capture Solomen. After 3 years of planning, Solomen got away the first time and D.K. wants to goad him and capture him. Did Officer Xia voluntarily join in this mission because he wants to make up and repay the guilt and shame that he has towards D.K.? This group of youngsters at the farewell camping party, what sort of laughter or tears will they have? Is Xia Tian really going to leave? Is Ah Jiang really going to lose his vision? Is D.K. really as cold and vicious as the article he published?

Episode 16

Three years passed by very quickly and a mature looking Xia Tian arrives at Ah Jiang's house. Along with D.K., she unexpectedly brings a wedding invitation and invites everyone to a wedding celebration. Ah Jiang watches as D.K. and Xia Tian leaves and shouts out loudly – Xia Tian... It turns out that it is only a dream. Xia Tian looks at Ah Jiang with surprise. Taking shelter from the rain, they spent a peaceful night at the small log cabin. Morning arrives and Ah Jiang puts on his coat and goes out to look for Fang Wei and Bulu. Xia Tian still has hopes that Ah Jiang will change because of her, but Ah Jiang only coldly walks away.

After working all night, Bulu finally breaks through D.K.’s password. Fang Wei translates D.K.’s article for everyone. The content of the whole article is referring to Officer Xia and will have a very big impact on Xia Tian. Everyone decides to go and save Officer Xia. As they are en route to Officer Xia's, their car breaks down on the road. Xiao Han and Xiao Hui stay behind to wait for help from a tow truck. Ying Ye 3+1 rush off to the site where D.K. and Officer Xia are waiting to capture Solomen. During the capture plan at the harbor, D.K. has the whole situation under control. Just like the steps that he outlined in the article, he pushes Officer Xia step by step to the front of the line. Holding onto the determination of this being a battle to the death, Solomen arrives. His first move is to use Officer Xia as a protection shield and also to threaten D.K.

Ying Ye 3+1 arrives at the scene and witnesses D.K. telling Solomen to go ahead and kill this person who is his enemy. Everyone is shocked and they quickly use the tools on the scene to create a huge confusion throughout. They managed to successfully capture Solomen but the timer bomb that is tied to Officer Xia has started ticking. The God of Death has started the countdown. In 3 minutes time, who will be able to solve this crisis? Of course, Fang Wei will not allow any tragedy to occur. Ying Ye 3+1 helps D.K. capture Solomen whom he has been trying to capture for three years. D.K. achieves a great success but he turns over the honor of this glory to Ying Ye 3+1 and Officer Xia. What is the reason behind their settlement over their dispute? After all, D.K. is a mature and capable police officer and Ying Ye 3+1 has experienced an incredible youthful adventure this summer. The most perfect union, the most perfect ending, will be presented in the last episode to you, the most faithful viewer.

Soundtrack

Ying Ye 3 + 1 Original Soundtrack (櫻野三加一 電視原聲帶) was released on March 8, 2007 by 5566, Joe Chen, Jason Hsu, and Ming Dao. It contains eleven songs, in which five songs are various instrumental versions of the five original songs. The opening theme song is "終極陷阱" or "Final Trap/Yes Sir" by 5566, while the ending theme song is by Ming Dao and Joe Chen entitled "再次相信" or "To Believe Again".

Track listing

Episode ratings

Source: Chinatimes Showbiz

References

External links
 Official website 
 樱野3加1 

Taiwanese drama television series
2007 Taiwanese television series debuts
2007 Taiwanese television series endings
Sanlih E-Television original programming
Television shows written by Ding-yu Xie